The Juventus F.C.–A.C. Milan rivalry is a football derby between Juventus and Milan. Both teams often fight for the top positions of the league standings, sometimes even decisive for the award of the title. It is the oldest clash still played in Italy since 1901, and it is the most played derby in Italy.

The meeting between Juventus and Milan is often experienced, in a way similar to the Derby d'Italia, as the reflection of the rivalry, both in political and economic, that divides Milan and Turin, the largest city of northwestern Italy and, together with Genoa, members of the so-called industrial triangle, the socio-economic region that had the greatest sports development in the country.

Official match results 
 SF = Semi-final
 QF = Quarter-final
 R16 = Round of 16
 R32 = Round of 32
 GS = Group stage
 R1 = Round 1
 R2 = Round 2

1The 1966–67 Coppa Italia semi-final was won 2–1 in extra-time by Milan.
2The 1972–73 Coppa Italia final was won 5–2 on penalties by Milan.
3The 2002–03 Champions League final was won 3–2 on penalties by Milan.
4The 2003 Supercoppa Italiana was won 5–3 on penalties by Juventus.
5The 2011–12 Coppa Italia semi-final was won 2–2 in extra-time after both teams were tied 3–3 on aggregate by Juventus.
6The 2012–13 Coppa Italia quarter-final was won 2–1 in extra-time by Juventus.
7The 2015–16 Coppa Italia final was won 1–0 in extra-time by Juventus.
8The 2016 Supercoppa Italiana was won 4–3 on penalties by Milan.

Statistics 
As of 9 October 2022

Top scorers

Below is the list of players with the most goals scored in official games.

Most appearances
Below is the list of players with the most appearances in official games.

Managers

Appearances

Records 

Largest victory: Milan 8–1 Juventus (1911–12)
Most goals in a game: Juventus 8–2 Milan (1926–27)
Biggest win for Juventus: Juventus 8–2 Milan (1926–27); Juventus 6–0 Milan (1925–26) 
Biggest win for Milan: Milan 8–1 Juventus (1911–12)
Biggest draw: Juventus 3–3 Milan (1930–31); Milan 3–3 Juventus (1946–47)
Biggest away win for Juventus: Milan 1–6 Juventus (1996–97)
Biggest away win for Milan: Juventus 1–7 Milan (1949–50)

Head-to-head ranking in Serie A (1930–2022)

• Total: Milan with 31 higher finishes, Juventus with 55 higher finishes, and 1 equal finish, in 1947–48 Serie A (as of the end of the 2021–22 season).

Notes:
 Both teams qualified for the final round of 8 teams in 1946  
 Both teams finished with the same number of points in 1948, and the regulation of the time did not contemplate tiebreakers: both teams finished in second place

Trophies 
Comparison of Juventus and Milan trophies won:

See also
Derby d'Italia
Derby della Mole
Derby della Madonnina

Footnotes and references

Juventus F.C.
A.C. Milan
Italian football derbies
Football in Turin
Football in Milan